Dan Turèll (March 19, 1946 – October 15, 1993), affectionately nicknamed "Onkel Danny" (Uncle Danny), was a popular Danish writer with notable influence on Danish literature. Influenced by the Beat Generation his work crossed a number of genres including autobiography, Beat literature and crime fiction.

Overview

Dan Turèll grew up in Vangede, which at that time was a town outside Copenhagen surrounded by fields; today it is a part of Greater Copenhagen. He died from esophageal cancer and is buried at Assistens Cemetery. On Sunday March 19, 2006, on what would have been his 60th birthday, part of the town square of Halmtorvet in Copenhagen was named Onkel Dannys Plads (English: Uncle Danny's Square) in Dan Turèlls honour and remembrance.

Turèll was unruly, modern, and experimental when it came to both content and form. He might probably himself have claimed to let the form at all times be a consequence of an interaction between theme and subject, which inevitably would lead to a flood of crossing genres; delightfully difficult to fit into a box.

There is often a touch of autobiography, or perhaps rather self-orchestration, to his works. He was very conscious of his own image. Many will remember him for his black nail polish. Thus his major breakthrough was the autobiographical novel, Vangede Billeder (English: Images of Vangede) from 1975. He shares subjects with the American Beat poets (mainly Allen Ginsberg, Jack Kerouac & William S. Burroughs): jazz, metropolis, drugs, and zen. He has an eye for the aesthetic dimensions of decline and degeneration, which he cultivates not least in his series of crime novels. Other recurring topics include Copenhagen, Malta, the teachings of Donald Duck, icons of American culture and the Americanisation, which the United States, for better or worse, had on Denmark.

Turèll loved his city of Copenhagen, its life, its noise and perhaps especially the little stories, that lurked everywhere. This love for the city is portrayed in many of his stories. It must be said, however, that his portrayal of Vesterbro is considerably more romantic than the Vesterbro of real life.

Turèll published quite a bit of his material himself, especially early in his career. He wrote in both Danish and English and has been translated into Dutch, Estonian, French, German, Norwegian, Swedish and Serbian.

Bibliography
Dan Turèll was a highly prolific writer, and this bibliography is in no way complete. He has contributed to numerous anthologies in his time and collections of his works are still being published to this day. He has also written a vast number of articles and essays for newspapers and various magazines on countless subjects. His wrapsheet is breathtaking. Danish literary  critic and writer, Lars Bukdahl, put it this way: He only lived to the age of 47, and it is as though he knew he had to hurry.

Cut-up literature
 Changes of Light, 1970
 Occult Confessions, 1970
 Speed of Light, 1970.
 Opsvulmede byer i sigtekornet flagrende skud i bevidstheden (English: Inflated Cities in the Sight Fluttering Shots in the Consciousness), 1972.
 Sidste forestilling bevidstløse trancebilleder af eksploderende spejltricks igennem flyvende tidsmaskine af smeltende elektriske glasfotos (English: Last Performance of Unconscious Trance Images of Exploding Mirror Tricks through Flying Time Machine of Melting Electrical Glass Photos), 1972
 Feuilleton 1: Faraway Signs (English: Serial 1: Faraway Signs), 1972
 Feuilleton 2: Laser Time Switch (English: Serial 2: Laser Time Switch), 1972
 Feuilleton 3: Filmen synker igennem Deres øjne (English: Serial 3: The Film Sinks Through Your Eyes), 1972
 Feuilleton 4: The Edison Kinetogram (English: Serial 4: The Edison Kinetogram), 1972
 Feuilleton 5: It's Just Another Whistle Stop (English: Serial 5: It's Just Another Whistle Stop), 1973
 Feuilleton 6: Not Fade Away ... (English: Serial 6: Not Fade Away ...), 1973
 Feuilleton 7: Deres kodeskrift under Dobbelt Sol (English: Serial 7: Your Cipher under Double Sun), 1973
 Feuilleton 8: Strangers in the Night (English: Serial 8: Strangers in the Night), 1978

Novels
 Dét døgn, da - (English: That Day, When -), 1992

The Murder Series
The so-called Mord-serie (English: Murder Series) consists of ten novels and two volumes of short stories in the "American" school of crime fiction, known from writers like Raymond Chandler. All twelve volumes follow the same protagonist, a nameless detective / reporter, a freelance writer for a fictitious Copenhagen newspaper, plainly called Bladet (English: The Paper). In each novel the protagonist is hurled into a new murder mystery, often along recurring characters, centrally among them Politiinspektør Ehlers (English: Inspector Ehlers). The stories are self contained, but settings, relations, and characters evolve as the series progress.

The series primarily takes place in an alternate version of the borough of Vesterbro in Copenhagen, which serves as a backdrop for considerably more criminal endeavours than real life will probably ever match. Also certain aspects of the city's geography has been altered. Certain streets lie differently, for instance.

 Mord i mørket (English: Murder in the Dark), 1981
 Mord i Rodby (English: Murder in Rodby), 1981
 Mord ved Runddelen (English: Murder by the Circle), 1983
 Mord på Malta (English: Murder on Malta), 1983
 Mord i marts (English: Murder in March), 1984
 Mord i september (English: Murder in September), 1984
 Mord i myldretiden (English: Murder during Rush Hour), 1985
 Mord på møntvaskeriet og andre kriminalhistorier (English: Murder in the Launderette and Other Crime Stories), short stories, 1986
 Mord i rendestenen (English: Murder in the Gutter), 1987
 Mord i Paradis (English: Murder in Paradise), 1988
 Mord på medierne (English: Murder on the Media), 1988
 Mord på markedet (English: Murder on the Market), 1989
 Mord i San Francisco (English: Murder in San Francisco), 1989

Poetry
 Vibrationer (English: Vibrations), 1966
 40 ark (English: 40 Sheets), 1969
 40 linier (English: 40 Lines), 1969
 Manuskripter I: Øjne/Further instructions (English: Manuscripts I: Eyes/Further Instructions), 1970
 Manuskripter II: Af beskrivelsen af det/Hvidt lys (English: Manuscripts II: From the Description of It/White Light), 1970
 Manuskripter om hvad som helst (English: Manuscripts about anything), 1971.
 Bevægelser, formålsløst cirklende (English: Movements, pointlessly circling), 1971
 Dobbeltskrift (English: Double Writing), 1973 - with Peter Laugesen
 Onkel Danny's dadaistiske discjockey djellaba jazzjungle joysticks (English: Uncle Danny's Dadaistic Disc-Jockey Djellaba Jazz-Jungle Joysticks), 1973
 Sekvens af Manjana - den endeløse sang flimrende igennem hudens pupiller (English: Sequence of Manjana, the Endless Song Flickering through the Pupils of the Skin), 1973
 Lissom (English: Like), 1973
 Digte m. m. (English: Poems and more), 1973 - with Peter Laugesen, Jens Smærup Sørensen, & Henning Mortensen
 Onkel Danny's drivende dansende dirrende dinglende daskende dryppende danske dåse-digte (English: Uncle Danny's Driving Dancing Dithering Dangling Dawdling Dripping Danish Dried Poems), 1974
 Onkel Danny's deliristiske jukebox jitterbug (English: Uncle Danny's Delirious Jukebox Jitterbug), 1974
 Karma Cowboy (English: Karma Cowboy), 1974; shortened version released in 1983
 Drive-in digte: non-stop neon-nat lys-avis (English: Drive-In Poems: Non-Stop Neon-Night Electric Newspaper), 1976
 Nytår i Rom (English: New Year in Rome), 1976
 Live-show feed-back: 5 sæt af Bøgernes Bog (English: Live-Show Feed-Back: 5 Sets of the Book of Books), 1976
 3-D digte (English: 3-D Poems), 1977
 Storby-Blues (English: Big City Blues), 1977
 Vesterbrobilleder (English: Images of Vesterbro), 1977 - with photos by Kurt Lesser
 Onkel Danny's små sorte sitrende swingende saxsoli sæbeboble-sange (English: Uncle Danny's Small Sable Shuddering Swinging Sax Solos Soapbubble Songs), 1978
 Onkel Danny's rullende rallende regnvejrs ragtime rhapsodi (English: Uncle Danny's Rolling Rollicking Rainstorm Ragtime Rhapsody), 1979
 Døgn-digte: udvalgte digte fra 70'erne (English: 24 Hour Poems: Selected Poems from the 70s), 1979
 Ulysses' spejl (English: Ulysses' Mirror), 1981 - with Henrik Nordbrandt, illustrated by Barry Lereng Wilmont
 Alhambra blues (English: Alhambra Blues), 1983
 Kom forbi: sange & recitationer (English: Drop By: Songs & Recitals), 1984
 Jazz-digte: et udvalg 1966-1986 (English: Jazz Poems: A Selection 1966-1986), 1986 - illustrated by Peter Hentze
 Forklædt til genkendelighed: sange, digte & recitationer (English: Recognizably Disguised: Songs, Poems & Recitals), 1988
 Himalaya Hilton (English: Himalaya Hilton), 1991
 Gud & Gokke (English: The Lord & Hardy), 1992
 Tja-a Cha-Cha (English: Tja-a Cha-Cha), 1993
 Udvalgte digte 1: 1969-1974 (English: Selected Poems 1: 1969-1974), 2003
 Udvalgte digte 2: 1973-1993 (English: Selected Poems 2: 1973-1993), 2004

Prose
 Områder af skiftende tæthed og tomhed (English: Areas of Alternating Density and Void), 1970
 Film (English: Film), 1973 - with Henrik Have
 Vangede billeder (English: Images of Vangede), memoirs, 1975
 Ezra Pound/William S. Burroughs/Lou Reed: 3 medie-montager (English: Ezra Pound/William S. Burroughs/Lou Reed: 3 Media Montages), 1975
 Rockens rødder. Medie-montager II (English: The Roots of Rock. Media Montages II), 1975
 SuperShowStjerneStøv. Medie-Montager III (English: SuperShowStarDust. Media Montages III), 1976
 Onkel Danny fortæller (English: Uncle Danny Relates), memoirs, 1976
 Af Livets Laboratorium. Medie-Montager IV (English: From the Lab of Life. Media Montages IV), 1977
 MenneskeMyteMaskinen. Medie-Montager V (English: ManMythMachine. Media Montages V), 1977
 Livets karrusel (English: The Merry-Go-Round of Life), 1977
 Onkel Danny fortæller videre (English: Uncle Danny Relates Further), memoirs, 1978
 Onkel Sams sønner. Medie-Montager VI (English: Uncle Sam's Sons. Media Montages VI), 1978
 Alverdens vampyrer: første forestilling på Grusomhedens Teater eller En idés rejse fra 5000 f. Kristus til i dag (English: All the World's Vampires: First Performance of the Theatre of Cruelty or The Journey of an Idea from 5000 b. Christ until Today), 1978
 Amerikanske ansigter: udvalgte artikler fra 70'erne (English: American Faces: Selected Articles from the 70's), 1979
 Møde i Garda: en fortælling i forbigående (English: Meeting in Garda: A Story in Passing), 1979
 Dan Turèll i byen: 50 historier af Københavns-krøniken fortalt fra dag til dag (English: Dan Turèll on the Town: 50 Stories from the Copenhagen Chronicle told from Day to Day), 1979 - illustrated by Peder Nyman
 Onkel Danny fortæller i timevis (English: Uncle Danny Relates for Hours on End), 1979
 Dan Turèll - et udvalg omkring en generation (English: Dan Turèll - A Selection About a Generation), 1981
 Onkel Danny fortæller på talløse opfordringer (English: Uncle Danny Relates by Countless Requests), memoirs, 1982
 Dan Turèll i byen igen: 50 historier af Københavns-krøniken fortalt fra dag til dag (English: Dan Turèll on the Town Again: 50 Stories from the Copenhagen Chronicle told from Day to Day), 1982 - illustrated by Peder Nyman
 Omkring på Brevduebanen (English: Around at the Carrier Pigeon Track), 1982
 Dansk dragefestival 1964-1984 (English: Danish Kite Festival 1964-1984), 1984 - with Bjarne Lynnerup
 Sort film: en privat dagbog omkring kriminalgenren (English: Film Noir: A Private Journal about the Crime Genre), 1984
 Shu-Bi-Dua - melodierne, teksterne, historien (English: Shu-Bi-Dua - the Melodies, the Lyrics, the Story), 1984 - essay by Turèll, note sheets and lyrics by Shu-Bi-Dua
 Dan Turèll i byen så det basker: 50 historier af Københavns-krøniken fortalt fra dag til dag (English: Dan Turèll on the Town with a Vengeance: 50 Stories from the Copenhagen Chronicle told from Day to Day), 1985 - illustrated by Peder Nyman
 Don Dobbeltliv og andre historier fra Stjernecaféen (English:  Don Double-Life and Other Stories from Star Café), short stories, 1985
 Nekrolog - blues for -- (English: Necrologue - Blues for --, 1987 - illustrated by Peter Hentze
 Blues for Buddha (English: Blues for Buddha), 1988 - illustrated by Peter Hentze
 Dan Turèll i byen - i dén grad!: 50 historier af Københavns-krøniken fortalt fra dag til dag (English: Dan Turèll on the Town - and how!: 50 Stories from the Copenhagen Chronicle told from Day to Day), 1988 - illustrated by Peder Nyman
 As time goes by - :klip fra den fortsatte scrap-bog (English: As Time Goes By -: Cuts from the Continued Scrapbook), 1989
 Dan Turèll i byen - og i baggårdene: 50 historier af Københavns-krøniken fortalt fra dag til dag (English: Dan Turèll on the Town - and in the Backyards: 50 Stories from the Copenhagen Chronicle told from Day to Day), 1991
 Undervejs med Copenhagen All Stars: et jazzband på turné i Danmark (English: On the Road with Copenhagen All Stars: A Jazzband on Tour in Denmark), 1991
 Dan Turèll i byen - for sidste gang: 37 historier af Københavns-krøniken fortalt fra dag til dag (English: Dan Turèll on the Town - One Last Time: 37 Stories from the Copenhagen Chronicle told from Day to Day), 1994
 Just a gigolo: klip fra den store scrap-bog 1989-93 (English: Just a Gigolo: Cuts from the Great Scrapbook 1989-93), 1995
 En nat ved højttaleren med sprogets mikrofon: rariteter, 1964-79 (English: A Night by the Speaker with the Mic of Language: rarities, 1964-79), 2003
 Medie-montager: greatest hits (English: Media Montages: Greatest Hits), 2003
 Charlie Parker i Istedgade: tekster om jazz (English: Charlie Parker in Istedgade: Texts about jazz), 2006

Spoken Word Recordings
 Dansk tale: to monologer (English: Danish Speech: Two Monologues), MC, 1981
 Dan Turèll & Sølvstjernerne (English: Dan Turèll & the Silver Stars), LP, 1991; CD, 1993 - with music by Sølvstjernerne
 Pas på pengene! (English: Watch the Money), CD, 1993 - with music by Halfdan E
 Glad i åbningstiden (English: Happy During Opening Hours), CD, 1996 - with music by Halfdan E
 Dan Turèll & Sølvstjernerne vender tilbage (English: Dan Turèll & the Silver Stars Return), CD, 2004 - with music by Sølvstjernerne

Works in English

The following poems of Dan Turèll have been published in English since 2009 when the American writer, Thomas E. Kennedy, began to translate and write about Turèll with his widow’s permission:
Three poems from Storby-Blues with essay, “Uncle Danny Comes to America,”  in New Letters, 73:2&3 (2009):126-39; four poems from Storby Blues, with essay, “Smoking Dan Turèll’s 27-year-old  Cigar,”in  Absinthe: New European Writing 12  (2009):34-58 {Reprinted in Perigee: Publication for the Arts, Fall 2012.] “Deep Frost Film,” Poetry Wales, 46:2:6-7 (Autumn 2010);  “My TV Drama,” in Ecotone 12 (University of North Carolina, Wilmington), Fall 2011, p. 73-75;   “Total Euphoria,” “It Isn’t Easy,” “I Should Have Been a Taxi Driver,” “Today’s Sermon According to Disney,” and “Charlie Parker on Isted Street,” with an “Introduction to Dan Turèll” by the translator, in Poet Lore, Vol 107, Spring-Summer 2012, No.1-2, pp 96-114;  .  “Autumn Blues,” “Midnight Mass,” and “Teddy Bear” in McNeese Review: 50 (2013):22-28;  “Too Much, Man,” in Epoch, Cornell University (forthcoming).

 The Total-Copy System, poetry, 1971.
 A Draft of XXX Space Cantos, crossover poetry, 1972
 Here Comes Your 19th Nervous Breakdown/Stones: Last Words 1972, poem, 1973
 Another Draft of Space Cantos, crossover poetry, 1974
 A Third Draft of Space Cantos, crossover poetry, 1974
 Feuilleton 8: Strangers in the Night (English: Serial 8: Strangers in the Night), 1978
 And all that jazz: Copenhagen Jazz Festival (English: And All That Jazz: Copenhagen Jazz Festival), photobook; text in both Danish and English - photos by Gorm Valentin

Adaptations
 His novels, Mord i mørket (English: Murder in the Dark) and Mord i Paradis (English: Murder in Paradise) both from 1981 were made into film in 1986 and 1988 respectively.
 In 2006 a musical theatre production, Onkel Danny'', was made about his life.

Legacy
The square Dan Turèlls Plads in his native Vangede was named for him on 9 March 2007. Onkel Dannys Plads (Uncle Danny's Square) in the Kødbyen area of Copenhagen's Vesterbro district is also named for him.

References

External links
 Turèll-samlingen (The Turèll Collection) at Vangede Public Library; homepage in Danish
 
 
 Profile of Dan Turèll at The Danish Literature Centre

1946 births
1993 deaths
Danish male poets
Danish male novelists
Danish crime fiction writers
Writers from Copenhagen
Deaths from esophageal cancer
Deaths from cancer in Denmark
20th-century Danish novelists
20th-century Danish poets
People from Vangede
People from Gentofte Municipality
20th-century Danish male writers